The 2014 Chinese FA Super Cup (Chinese: 2014中国足球协会超级杯) is the 12th Chinese FA Super Cup. The match was played at Guiyang Olympic Sports Center on 16 February 2014, contested by Super League winners Guangzhou Evergrande and FA Cup winners Guizhou Moutai.

Guizhou Moutai defeated Guangzhou Evergrande 1–0, thus winning their first ever Chinese FA Super Cup title, and Guangzhou lost for two consecutive years.

Match

Details

References

External links
 

FA Super Cup
2014
Guangzhou F.C. matches